A. Fletcher Spigner House, also known as the Spigner-Wilson-Seibels House and Hanner House, is a historic home located at Columbia, South Carolina. It was built in 1920, and is a -story double-pile, rectangular frame residence in the Tudor Revival style.  It has a one-story, central front portico, a red terra cotta tile roof, and faux half-timbering with a finish of stucco on the second floor. Also on the property is a -story garage. It was built for A. Fletcher Spigner, a prominent Columbia attorney, State Senator, and South Carolina's Fifth Circuit Solicitor.

It was added to the National Register of Historic Places in 2009.

References

Houses on the National Register of Historic Places in South Carolina
Tudor Revival architecture in South Carolina
Houses completed in 1920
Houses in Columbia, South Carolina
National Register of Historic Places in Columbia, South Carolina